The Vandeput Baronetcy, of Twickenham in the County of Middlesex, was a title in the Baronetage of Great Britain. It was created on 7 November 1723 for Peter Vandeput. The title became extinct on the death of the second Baronet in 1784.

George Vandeput, illegitimate son of the second Baronet, was an Admiral in the Royal Navy.

Vandeput baronets, of Twickenham (1723)
Sir Peter Vandeput, 1st Baronet (–1748)
Sir George Vandeput, 2nd Baronet (c. 1717–1784)

References

Extinct baronetcies in the Baronetage of Great Britain
History of the London Borough of Richmond upon Thames
1723 establishments in England
1784 disestablishments in England